Marvin Hunt (born September 6, 1951) is a Canadian politician, who was elected to the Legislative Assembly of British Columbia in the 2013 provincial election for the Surrey-Panorama riding. He was re-elected in the district of Surrey-Cloverdale in the 2017 provincial election as a member of the British Columbia Liberal Party.

Prior to his election to the legislature, Hunt was a longtime member of Surrey City Council. He was first elected as a city councillor in 1988. In 2011, Hunt joined Surrey First, headed by mayor Dianne Watts.

Electoral record

References

External links
- Official MLA site
- Marvin Hunt Twitter account

British Columbia Liberal Party MLAs
Living people
Surrey, British Columbia city councillors
Year of birth uncertain
21st-century Canadian politicians
1951 births